The list of Olympic men's ice hockey players for Belarus consists of 43 skaters and 4 goaltenders. Men's ice hockey tournaments have been staged at the Olympic Games since 1920 (it was introduced at the 1920 Summer Olympics, and was permanently added to the Winter Olympic Games in 1924). Belarus has participated in three tournaments since becoming independent in 1991: 1998, 2002 and 2010. As part of the Soviet Union, Belarus previously participated in the Winter Olympics from 1956 until 1988, as well as with the Unified Team at the 1992 Winter Olympics. Belarus has never won a medal in ice hockey, with their highest finish being fourth in 2002. 

Four players — goaltender Andrei Mezin and skaters Oleg Antonenko, Alexei Kalyuzhny, and Ruslan Salei — have played in all three Olympics Belarus has participated in, with Kalyuzhny playing in the most games, 20. Kalyuzhny has scored the most goals for Belarus (5), while Alexander Andrievsky and Dmitri Dudik have the most assists (6). Five players — Andrievsky, Dudik, Kalyuzhny, Andrei Kovalev, and Vadim Bekbulatov — have 7 points, the most scored at the Olympics. Salei is the only Belarusian player to be inducted into the International Ice Hockey Federation Hall of Fame.

Key

Goaltenders

Skaters

See also
 Belarus men's national ice hockey team

Notes

References
 
 
 
 

Belarus men's national ice hockey team
ice hockey
Belarus
Belarus